Charles Joseph Staniland  (19 June 183816 June 1916) was a prolific British genre, historical, and marine painter and a leading Social Realist illustrator. He was a mainstay of the Illustrated London News and The Graphic in the 1870s and 1880s.

Early life
Staniland was born at Kingston upon Hull in Yorkshire on (19 June 1838) the son of Joseph Staniland, a merchant. He studied at the Birmingham School of Art under David Wilkie Raimbach, at the Heatherley School of Fine Art, and the Normal Training School of Art in South Kensington. He was admitted as a student of the Royal Academy on 2 May 1861, having successfully completed his probationary term.

He married Elizabeth Parsons Buckman (c. 18441920) in Edgbaston, Warwick, on 15 September 1868.. The couple had five children, all of whom survived to adulthood: 
 Charles Norman Staniland (12 March 187131 May 1935)
 Maud Elizabeth Staniland (born 6 February 1873)
 Ellen Laura Sylvia Staniland (born 7 March 1874)
 Catherine Wells Staniland (born 20 November 1877)
 Eric Flemming Staniland (17 December 188023 June 1943) 

By 1871 Staniland was living with his wife and first child at Hogarth Cottage in Chiswick, and was doing well enough to have a monthly nurse as well as a servant. By 1881, he was living at 15 Steele's Road in Hampstead with his wife and all five of his children. He also had two live-in domestic servants and a governess for his children. The governess was Rosa Wells and her brother, Josiah Robert Wells (c. 18491897), an artist, was a boarder.

Staniland and Wells collaborated on several book illustration projects including The Three Admirals by William Henry Giles Kingston (Griffith & Farran. London 1878) and The Pirate Island by Harry Collingwood (Blackie and Son, London, 1885). Wells was the principal marine artist for The Illustrated London News for 18731883, specialising in marine subjects and ship portraits. Houfe refers to him as the "Fleet Special Artist" of Illustrated London News. Wells was still living with the Stanilands at the time of the 1891 census. Wells died on 27 June 1897 in Brookwood and Holloway Mental Hospital.

Staniland was living with his wife and his three unmarried children at 3 Hawkswood Crescent, in Chingford, Essex, at the time of the 1901 census. By 1911, he was living with his daughter Catherine at 1 Millfield Villas, Fleet, Hampshire. His wife was with their daughter Ellen's husband and family at the time of the census. It is not clear if the couple had split up or if his wife was just on a visit.

Staniland died on 16 June 1916, at 134 Oxford Road, Acock's Green, Birmingham. He does not appear to have left a will. His wife survived until 1920.

Works
Staniland worked as a painter and as an illustrator. He produced a large volume of work for the illustrated newspapers.

Painting
Staniland began exhibiting at the Royal Academy in 1863 and continued to do so irregularly until 1881.

Staniland was elected an associate of the RI in 1875, and became a full member in 1879. He resigned in 1890. He was a member of the ROI from his election in 1883 until his resignation in 1896.

Staniland painted in both watercolours and oils, and sometimes painted on a theme. In the case of The Emigrant Ship, Staniland exhibited a watercolour The last Day in Old England at the RI in 1875. This showed a party of emigrants about to leave the country, in a scene near the docks. The Globe said that the watercolour was "full of suggestion". In the Emigrant Ship also known as Good-Bye! we see the quayside as the ship is about to depart. The Liverpool Mercury stated that the painting was "full of heart-rending scenes in tearing asunder family ties" and that the painting was truly "a splendid work. . . The subject is well chosen as regards the position of the vessel, and there is a beautiful bit of dim smoky distance, so like London, and so cleverly done. To those who like this kind of subject it will prove a world of pleasure in examining for years. Treuherz notes that among other social realist themes The Graphic publish several scenes of emigrants leaving by ship, with lively portrayals of both the excitement and pain of departure, and cites this work by Staniland as an example.

Magazine and newspaper illustration
As an illustrator, Staniland was primarily a newspaper and magazine illustrator. Staniland became a staff member of the Illustrated London News and later of The Graphic. He contributed to a wide range of magazines including:
Atalanta
Aunt Judy's Magazine
The Boy's Own Paper
The British Workman
Cassell's Family Magazine
The Children's Friend
Chums
The English Illustrated Magazine
Golden Hours
Good Words
Harper's Weekly
The Illustrated London News
The Leisure Hour
London Society
Longman's Magazine
The Pall Mall Magazine
The Quiver
Short Stories
The Strand Magazine
The Wide World Magazine

In 1886 Staniland not only illustrated but also authored a two part account of the Lifeboats and Lifeboat-men of Great Britain. This ran in The English Illustrated Magazine in February and March of that year.

Book illustration
Kirkpatrick lists over 90 books illustrated by Staniland. Some of these were illustrated in collaboration with Wells.

Among the authors that Staniland illustrated for were: 
Hans Christian Andersen (18051875), a prolific Danish author best remembered for his fairy tales.
Christabel Rose Coleridge (18431921), who wrote improving stories for children.
Harry Collingwood (18431922), a writer of boys' adventure fiction, usually in a nautical setting.
George Manville Fenn (18311909), a prolific author of fiction for young adults.
Thomas Frost (18211908), an English radical journalist and writer.
G. A. Henty (18321902), a prolific writer of boy's adventure fiction, often set in a historical context, who had himself served in the military and been a war correspondent.
F.M. Holmes
Ascott R. Hope (18461927), a prolific author of children's books, especially school stories, and of Black's Guides.
W. H. G. Kingston (18141880), who wrote boy's adventure fiction.
Emma Leslie (18381909), Emma Boultwood, wrote more than 100 books, mostly juvenile and historical titles with a Christian message.
Frederick Marryat (17921848), a Royal Navy officer who wrote adventure books for children.
Georgina Norway (18331915), who wrote adventure fiction for children as "G. Norway".
Eliza F. Pollard (18391901), a polific author who turned to fiction in 1864 after a brief stint as a governess.
Charles Napier Robinson (18491938), a Royal Naval officer who on retirement, became a journalist on naval matters and published the journal Navy and army illustrated : a magazine descriptive and illustrative of everyday life in the defensive service of the British Empire..
Walter Scott (17711832), the Scottish historical novelist, poet, and historian who wrote Ivanhoe.
Edward Whymper (18401911), an English explorer, mountaineer, illustrator, and author. Brother to Frederick Whymper.
Charlotte Mary Yonge (18231901), who became a Sunday School teacher aged seven and remained one for the next seventy one years, she wrote to promote her religious views.

In 1886 Staniland illustrated The Dragon and The Raven, or The Days Of King Alfred. by George Alfred Henty (Blackie & Son, London 1886). The illustrations were made with line blocks from fine pen-drawings drawn in a manner that makes the picture look like wood-engravings.

Assessment

Houfe states that "Staniland’s strength was in marine illustrations where the ships and tackle were seen at close quarters and the working seaman was observed in large scale" and that "His many contributions to The Illustrated London News and The Graphic were a mainstay of those periodicals in the 1870s and 1880s, readers had practically to wipe the brine from their faces as they turned the pages." The Hampstead and Highgate Express called him a "dextrous and humourous" artist.

Houfe also stated that Staniland "was also an excellent portrait artist and painted still-life and bird subjects in watercolour." His social realist images for the Graphic, particularly those of mining, were much admired by Van Gogh.

The best auction results for Staniland reported by Benezit are:
 London, 21 July 1887, The Lotus Eaters (1883, watercolour and pencil heightened with white, 75x122 cm) 4,800GBP.
 London, 5 March 1993, At the Back of the Church (1876, pencil and watercolour, 151.1x91.6cm) 8,050GBP. 
 London, 6 Nov 1996, The Dutch Delegation Offering the Crown of Holland to Henri III of France (1884, oil on canvas, 106.5x184cm) 10,120GBP. The same piece had sold for 5,500GBP in London 13 years earlier on 19 Oct 1983.

Notes

References

External links
 
 

1838 births
1916 deaths
19th-century British painters
English watercolourists
British portrait painters
Alumni of the Royal Academy Schools
British male painters
English illustrators
British illustrators
British children's book illustrators
Magazine illustrators
Members of the Royal Institute of Oil Painters
Members of the Royal Institute of Painters in Water Colours
Alumni of the Heatherley School of Fine Art
19th-century British male artists